
Year 507 (DVII) was a common year starting on Monday (link will display the full calendar) of the Julian calendar. At the time, it was known as the Year of the Consulship of Anastasius and Venantius (or, less frequently, year 1260 Ab urbe condita). The denomination 507 for this year has been used since the early medieval period, when the Anno Domini calendar era became the prevalent method in Europe for naming years.

Events 
 By place 

 Byzantine Empire 
 Emperor Anastasius I completes the strategic fortress at Dara (Northern Mesopotamia). He raises the city walls to 30 feet (10 m), disregarding Persian protests. Alarmed by the depredations of Slavs and Bulgars in Thrace, he builds the Anastasian Wall from the Black Sea to Propontis, across the narrow peninsula near Constantinople (modern Turkey).

 Europe 
 Battle of Vouillé: A Frankish army under command of Clovis I invades the Visigothic Kingdom, and defeats King Alaric II near Poitiers. The Visigoths refuse to be enslaved, and retreat to Septimania (Southern Gaul). Clovis annexes Aquitania, and captures Toulouse.  
 Gesalec succeeds his father Alaric II as king of the Visigoths. He establishes his residence at Narbonne and is supported by an alliance with the Ostrogothic king Theodoric the Great.
 Clovis I dictates the Salic Law (Code of the Barbaric Laws) to the Franks (a written codification of civil law for citizens of the Frankish Kingdom).  
 Hermanafrid, king of the Thuringii, marries Amalaberga. He begins his rule, shared with his brothers Baderic and Bertachar. 
 Wooden coffins and wooden tools are used in the burial places of the Alemanni.

 Asia 
 The town of Guilin, China, is renamed Guizhou.
 Keitai becomes the 26th emperor of Japan (according to the Nihon Shoki).
 The first and smaller of the two Buddhas of Bamyan is erected in central Afghanistan.

 Mesoamerica 
 A Mayan altar with the head of the death god is built in Copán, Honduras.

Births 
 John of Ephesus, Armenian bishop (approximate date)  
 Wen Di, emperor of Western Wei (d. 551)
 Xiao Zhuang Di, emperor of Northern Wei (d. 531)
 Yuwen Tai, general of Western Wei (d. 556)

Deaths 
 Alaric II, king of the Visigoths
 Aprus, bishop of Toul  
 Domangart Réti, king of Dál Riata (modern Scotland)
 Yu, empress of Northern Wei (b. 488)

References